The Lainingthou Sanamahi Kiyong, officially known as the Laiyingthou Sanamahi Kiyong, is a temple of God Lainingthou Sanamahi of Meitei religion (Sanamahism), built on the Nongmaiching mountain (Selloi Langmai mountain) in the Imphal East district of Kangleipak. It is a center of the Sanamahism followers in Manipur.
It is the central body of the "Sanamahi Lainingkol" (University of Sanamahi Culture) at Chingoi Maru Langmaiching (Nongmaiching).

The Sanamahi Kiyong is a religious destination and a pilgrimage site for the Meitei people, even for those living outside Manipur in other Northeast Indian states and also for the Kabui people and the Zeliangrong people living in Manipur, Assam and Tripura inside India as well as in Myanmar and Bangladesh.

Aim 
The construction of the Sanamahi Kiyong temple aims at the establishment of a university of Sanamahi religion on the Nongmaiching mountain.
It was built according to a 2002 resolution adopted at a public meeting having a goal to construct a university for Sanamahism, with the aim to teach the future generations of people about the ancient Meitei culture of the Sanamahi religion, offering its students various subjects about indigenous art forms, dance forms, music, Thang-Ta and Sagol Kangjei etc.

Architecture 

It has 7 stories, that represent the seven clans of the Meitei people. The 7 stories are painted in the colours of the 7 Meitei clans.

Construction 
The construction of the Sanamahi Kiyong started in the year 2006. It was done through the donated funds raised from the public.

Inauguration 
The Sanamahi Kiyong was previously planned to be inaugurated on 16 May 2019. But it was postponed to 8 June 2019 because religious leaders advised that it should be done on Meitei month of Enga and not on the month of Kalen and 8 June falls on Enga, the favourable month.

On 8 June 2019, the "Sanamahi Kiyong Hongba" was organised by the "Foundation For University of Sanamahi Culture" and the "Laiyingthou Sanamahi Thougal Kanglup". The event was attended by N Hiyainu, wife of Nongthombam Biren, the then Chief Minister of Manipur.

Gallery

See also 
 Nongmaiching Ching
 Nongmaiching Reserved Forest
 Heingang Ching
 Marjing Polo Complex
 Marjing Polo Statue
 Hiyangthang Lairembi Temple
 Kangla
 Kangla Nongpok Thong
 Kangla Nongpok Torban

Notes

References

External links 

 Sanamahi Kiyong at 
 Sanamahi Kiyong at Wikimapia
 

Meitei architecture
Cultural heritage of India 
Imphal East district 
Landmarks in India 
Meitei culture 
Meitei pilgrimage sites 
Monuments and memorials in India 
Monuments and memorials in Imphal 
Monuments and memorials in Manipur 
Monuments and memorials to Meitei people 
Monuments and memorials to Meitei royalties 
Public art in India 
Temples in Manipur 
Tourist attractions in India